Mando or Manddo (Konkani mānḍô) is a musical form that evolved during the 19th and 20th centuries among the Goan Catholics. It represents a meeting point of local Goan (Goa was part of Portugal at the time) and western musical traditions.

 The music has elements of both traditional Goan and western culture. The males wear formal coats while females wear Western dress.

The dress worn during the mando dance was of velvet or silk, red, blue or green in colour, embroidered with gold (rarely with silver) threads. A white or blue shawl was worn. The socks had to be white and the slippers ornamented.

This was all graced with a fan, which enhanced the lady's mood with a secret charm during the dance. Nowadays mandos are highlighted with their dance respective of their song. The plural of manddo in Konkani is mande. The major theme of mandos is love. The charming singing enhances the performance.

Instruments used in mando music are guitars, violins and the ghumot drum.

The accent in Konkani is almost always on the last syllable. The Konkani dialect used in the classical mandos is that of Salcete, particularly as spoken in the villages of Benaulim, Curtorim, Cortalim, Dabolim, Dramapur, Loutolim, Margao-Fatorda, Quelossim, and Raia, where most of the Mandos originated.

It is the most musical of the Konkani dialects with its consistent use of elisions. One of the characteristics of this dialect is that words are stretched out in pronunciation with the addition of an extra vowel sound either in the middle of the words or at the end epenthesis. The suffixes –i and –o are commonly used to add an extra syllable to a line. Thus  becomes  and  becomes . The full sound -o- is softened in this dialect. Thus  becomes , mozo becomes muzo. The possessive pronouns in the mando have the Salcete form, as tugel´lem for tujem, mugel´lem for mujem or mojem. Shorter forms are derived when the music needs to cut off a syllable, e.g. tuj´ kodden (koddem) instead of tuje koddem and mak´ naka instead of maka naka. Not only the phonetics correspond to the Salcete dialect but also words like masoli (masli) for "fish" instead of nishtem, e.g. "". A girl or a woman is addressed with "rê" (same as a man) instead of "gô" and use the pronoun "ti" instead of "tem".

The mando is mostly a monologue, in the first person singular or plural, except for the historical narratives. In some mandos, however, one person addresses another, who in turn replies. Singing is accompanied by gentle turning sideways to the rhythm, thus creating both a visual and auditory performance.

Some famous mandos are:
 Bara Tera Orsam Zalim
 Dove Rozericho Collo 
 Gupit Môg Burgeaponancho
 Sangato Moga Tuzo

See also
Deknni
Dulpod
Fugdi

Citations

References

External links
Goan culture article
Collection of Mandos

Goan music